Vitalij Kozlov (born 5 March 1987) is a Lithuanian runner who specializes in the 800 metres.

He finished seventh at the 2007 European U23 Championships, and competed at the 2008 Olympic Games and the 2010 World Indoor Championships without reaching the final.

In 2009 he reached new national record in 800 m.

His personal best time is 1:46.58 minutes, achieved in July 2008 in Kaunas.

References

1987 births
Living people
Lithuanian male middle-distance runners
Olympic athletes of Lithuania
Athletes (track and field) at the 2008 Summer Olympics